First life may refer to
 How life arose from non-life: see Abiogenesis
 First life forms
 First Life (TV series)
 IndiaFirst Life Insurance Company